The Tongan records in swimming are the fastest ever performances of swimmers from Tonga, which are recognised and ratified by the Tonga Swimming Association.

All records were set in finals unless noted otherwise.

Long Course (50 m)

Men

Women

Mixed relay

Short Course (25 m)

Men

Women

Mixed relay

References

Tonga
Records
Swimming